Viscount Island is an island in the Central Coast region of British Columbia, situated on the east side of the southern entrance to Tribune Channel from lower Knight Inlet, to the southeast of Gilford Island.  A narrow waterway, Sergeaunt Passage, separates it from the mainland to its east.

See also
List of islands of British Columbia
Viscount (disambiguation)

References

Islands of British Columbia
Central Coast of British Columbia